Jean Fassina (born 9 November 1936) is a French classical pianist born in Algiers.

A concertist, direct heir of the great Paderewski piano tradition, Fassina is a recognized teacher who counts a pleiad of French and foreign artists among his students.

Biography 
Coming from a line of pianists, (his grandmother was a pianist and composer, his mother performed in concert and was his first teacher), he trained at a very young age at the Conservatoire de Paris. After winning his prizes there, Fassina felt the desire to go and study in Eastern European countries, where the results of the teaching given there worked wonders in international competitions: "When not one but twenty pianists dazzle you, there is something obvious about it".

He obtained a scholarship that allowed him to study in Poland. He completed his training as a pianist in Krakow, the high place of the Polish piano school, under the benevolent guidance of Henryk Sztompka, himself a former student of Paderewski and worthy heir of an instrumental and stylistic tradition going back to Chopin and Liszt.

In the first lesson, Sztompka told him "You are a musician, but you have to do everything over again...". Thus began four years of intensive work which Fassina himself describes as "the most extraordinary of his life".

After a short and intense concert career from 1961 to 1975, he devoted himself to what he considered his true vocation: teaching the piano. In about ten years, he trained a good number of artists and teachers of all nationalities, to whom he passed on the knowledge he received in Poland.

After forty years of teaching, Jean Fassina published a book (Lettre à un jeune pianiste Fayard) in which he shares his pianistic knowledge and his pedagogical experience.

Pedagogy 
Fassina teaches in many countries in Europe and Asia:
 Conservatoire de Strasbourg,
 Academies of Nice and Barèges (France),
 Académie de Haut Perfectionnement de Musique de Saluzzo (Italy),
 Conservatories of Sapporo, Osaka, Hiroshima, Okinawa (Japan),
 Central Conservatory of Music (China),
 Rencontres internationales d’Enghien,

Pupils 
More than a hundred internationally known musicians have been students of Fassina such as:
 Jacques Rouvier,
 Michel Béroff,
 Olivier Gardon
 Jean-Rodolphe Kars,
 Jacqueline Bourges-Mounoury
 Jean-Louis Haguenauer,
 Beate Perrey,

Master classes 
Fassina is the permanent guest of prestigious master classes:
 Institut Chopin de Varsovie,
 Rencontre internationale de musique d'Enghien,
 Institut supérieur de musique et de pédagogie as well as the Higher Conservatories and Universities of Porto, Brussels, Bucharest, Beijing, Tokyo, Osaka.

Jury of international competitions 
He also sits on the jury of numerous international competitions:
 Concours international P.T.N.A (Japan 2003)
 Concours international Frédéric Chopin de Moscou (Russia 2004)
 Concours international de Musique de Porto (Portugal 2002 and 2004)
 Concours international de Musique du Maroc (March 2013)
 Piano Campus International Competition (Pontoise, France, 2002, 2005, 2008, 2011)

Sources 
 Lettre à un jeune pianiste - Jean Fassina - Foreword by Jacques Rouvier - Éditions Fayard - III 2000

References

Bibliography 
 Lettre à un jeune pianiste - Jean Fassina - Foreword by Jacques Rouvier - Éditions Fayard - III 2000

External links 
 Entretien avec Jean Fassina, Pianiste

20th-century French male classical pianists
Conservatoire de Paris alumni
People from Algiers
1936 births
Living people
Piano pedagogues